La Victoria is a municipality in the province of Córdoba, Spain. In the year 2011 its population was 2,336.

Demography 

Number of inhabitants in the last eleven years.

Art and monumental heritage

Patrimonio Histórico Andaluz (Historical Andalusian heritage) 

La Victoria has many cultural buildings because of it there is declared historical Andalusian Heritage.

Geography 

La Victoria borders with: The Carlota, San Sebastian of the Archers and Cordova. And also this one divided in a sector: The First sector: Village Quintana.

Natural spaces 

In the municipality of Cordoba Victory are two natural areas:

 MONTE BENEGUILLAS

Stain oaks and scrub vegetation that covers the so-called Monte Beneguillas (at the western end and along the right bank of the arroyo de la Torre). It is situated on a sunny hillside with steep slopes, hence its name. It is an ancient stronghold of Mediterranean forest of oaks, the only unit on forestry in the municipality of La Victoria, consisting of a dense vegetation in which they appear, mainly oaks, mastic trees and olive trees. It has a small extension (1.3 ha). It, along the oak adehesado Tocina, the only witness to the climax vegetation of the area, i.e. the primitive vegetation, still undisturbed by man. Conservation over time of this stain of vegetation has occurred due to the slope makes it impracticable for cultivation. However, the Monte Beneguillas is a place frequented by residents of the environment as a place of leisure, recreation and outdoor recreation, a fact that sometimes generates dirt and attacks on the vegetation of this area of great ecological value.

 DEHESA Tocina

The oak adehesado Tocina, is located north of the municipality of La Victoria, 1 km from the city center, with an area of 233.2 belonging to the estate has the same name. The geomorphology of the area is characterized by the presence of rolling hills with small streams and vertebrate seasonal regajos, by which the water flows only during rainy seasons. It is a landscape with arable land of oaks, which are present copies of larger sized oaks of the municipality, with particularly high density in its northern, instead seized in recent years to host the festival of San Isidro Labrador . The original oak forest has been cleared over time to leave open spaces for farming (alternating wheat-sunflower). The following images shows the evolution of the pasture in the past 60 years, from 1956-1957 American flight to date in 2009. You can see the amount of oak and scrub sets have disappeared during this period of time.

History 

Most historians agree that the foundation of the town is linked to the establishment of the Minims of St. Francis of Paula in Córdoba, when General of the Order requested the Bishop of Cordoba, Juan Daza and Osorio, your competition and the council, to establish in this city a convent of the Pauline order. The convent itself was founded Cordoba February 18, 1510, and the founder of the Order of Minims was beatified on 7 July 1513, reaching holiness, becoming San Francisco de Paula, on May 1, 1519. In 1810, when Spain was during the War of Independence, La Victoria, for the most part a vast olive grove, it was then known as The Guijarrosa to be part of an old and large parts of the Rambla with the same name. Near the present town was what we now call "The Old Victoria", i.e., the "inheritance" with "houses, wine cellar, winery, battery and jars, vines and trees" and "everything that belongs" that the November 21, 1551 bought the tanner Hillón Alonso and his wife, Isabel Rodriguez, Fray Andrés de Santa Maria to donate shortly after the January 26, 1552, the Minimum or friars of San Francisco de Paula del Convento of Our Lady of Victory in Cordoba.In the above "inheritance" Least built a chapel, whose existence we have been well documented, at least with respect to the eighteenth century: here they were married many of the ancestors who, for the most part, lived in humble and isolated "homes of campocubiertas straw "or" branch ", as they are called in the land of the Marquis de la Ensenada held in mid of that century. Along the same farm was also a cemetery.The subsequent emancipation of Victoria regarding La Rambla was, ultimately, in the light of Article 310, "La Pepa", the Constitution was born in Cadiz on March 19, 1812 and was reactivated on 15 August 1836 by Queen Maria Cristina.

sights 

 CHAPEL HOUSE MONKS MINIMUM

The Old Victoria, that is, the "inheritance" with "houses, wine cellar, winery, battery and jars, vines and trees" and "with everything that belongs to him" that the November 21, 1551 bought the tanner Alonso Hillón and his wife, Isabel Rodriguez, Fray Andrés de Santa Maria to donate shortly after the January 26, 1552, the Minimum or friars of San Francisco de Paula of the Convent of Our Lady of Victory in Cordoba.

 Torre DON LUCAS(the tower Don Lucas)

The Tower of Don Lucas was raised in Arab times, not knowing the exact date of its construction. On the evidence obtained in the vicinity is supposed to belong to the times of Alhaquen I (808-809 of the Christian Era). It is located northwest of Victoria, within the municipality, about three hundred meters from the local road linking the village with The Victoria Quintana. Built of limestone, sand, pebbles ...

 Iglesia de SAN PEDRO DE ALCÁNTARA (the church San Pedro de Alcantara)

The Church of San Pedro de Alcantara, was built on land owned by the Order of St. Francis of Paula in 1818. On 30 August this year was held at the newly built Holy holy place Pastoral Visit of Bishop Pedro Antonio de Trevilla. On 1 October the same year, in gratitude for the construction of the new church, Father Jose Antonio Valenzuela asked the prelate who could put the temple under the patronage ...

 Ayuntamiento (city council)

Original building of 1926, of simple but well composed facade and some evocative, overall, of baroque airs. In 2004 he proceeded to its expansion by adding an adjoining house, but has fully respected the original style. In the City Hall are located the UTEDLT (Unit Area Employment and Local Development and Technology), the OCA (Office District Agricultural) and local police.

 BULL RIAZA

In October 1973 appeared by chance a sculpture of a bull "Art Iberian" near the town in the area known as Pozo de Riaza. The archaeological discovery of this piece were three tenants who were on a mooring on his farm. The rare copy of this white stone, fine-grained, easily worked, known as "sepia" and the fourth is about five feet long by 90 ...

 THUNDER STONE

Its shape and size is thought that this curious specimen of lithic prehistoric era who remained long upon the land, took more boom hypothesis to find the bull Riaza Iberian bull, in the vicinity. It is thought that this rock must have been a milestone, or menhir, placed beside the road that crossed the people to carry their dead to the place of Riaza, which gave him grave.

Dining 

The cuisine is fully victoreña related to the old name of the Master family, which at the end of last century had several grocery stores as well as wines, spirits and pork. Since then production has grown charcuterie, highlighting the sausages called rosaries and ancient onion sausages able to satisfy the most discerning palates. Highlights include old family recipes, such as beans palomeras, which used to be eaten on farms, potato croquettes and melon twisted roll. Special mention goes to pig's feet, the gazpacho, gazpacho, baked, but crumbs, chopped maimones and oranges with cod and onion. Bookmark the typical sweets such as bores, the flowers, the informers, donuts orange and anise, not to mention the lard buns stuffed with chocolate and pumpkin, tortillas, lard and muffins made in a handmade by local women. And it should also highlight the giant doblaita day of All Saints (Nov. 1) and also make porridge.

Festivals 

 CANDELARIA

The night before the feast of the Purification of Our Lady, February 1, light bonfires, fed with olive branches, squares and streets of different neighborhoods of the town. Formerly competed to see which was the largest and longest running and joined townspeople around them to consume traditional chocolate sopaipas.
 CARNIVALA

party with a lot of roots in the town where the people walk the streets dressed and equipped with musical instruments, drums, cymbals, tambourines, bells.

 PALM SUNDAY

Previously on this day, lovers gave their chosen test their feelings, leaving the previous night at their windows, olive branches and flowers. If during the day following the branch remained in place meant that the feelings of the gallant were appreciated. Today flowers are drawn on the door of love.

 PILGRIMAGE OF SAN ISIDRO

The pilgrimage was first held in Victoria on May 15, 1960. A group of people put money and bought the likes of plaster saint. This group was called "Brotherhood Association of Farmers and Ranchers," which later became "Chamber of Agriculture."In the village, the first pilgrimage was held in the vicinity of La Torre de Don Lucas, until 1970 was held in El Cuco. In 1971 was held at the Cooperative Olivarera Virgen de la Torre (due to inclement weather). Also held in Santa Cruz for 2 years and Tocina, near La Laguna. In Beneguillas in the 80's until 1997. In 1998, for lack of people in the organization and the rain, was held at the soccer field in town. It was from this date, when the 27 August 1998 developer board meets with neighbors and partners in other years to create a cultural association that after San Isidro Labrador is named "Oleanders and Retamas".In 1999 was the last year held in Beneguillas, from 2000 to present, takes place in Tocina in different areas of this farm.

 FAIR SAN JUAN

It is celebrated on June 24, the day of San Juan Bautista, on the fairgrounds. The queens are selected and gallants both children and youth, and @ victoreñ year the weekend prior to the start. There are activities that have been repeated in the traditional way, such as parades, clowns, magicians, bicycle ride, the feature "What a childhood fair equality" dinner for the elderly, foam party, dominated the local championship, pitch, the performance of the choir and school Guadalmazán dance Rosario Moreno.

 EASTER

Week in which the different sororities draw their steps through the streets of the town. The Brotherhood of the Holy Christ of the End and the Virgin of Victory. Processions in the evening of Holy Thursday. The passage of Our Lady of Sorrows procession in the morning and evening of Friday, accompanying the steps of Our Father Jesus of Nazareth and the Holy Christ recumbent. The passage of Nuestro Padre Jesus Nazareno procession at dawn on Good Friday and Holy Christ Lying on the night of Friday.

 FEAST OF THE IMMACULATE

On 8 December is the feast of the patron saint of the town, leaving in procession through the town.

Routes 

 NATURAL PATH

One of the actions of the project RELAS (Local Network Health Action) has been the creation of a route linking the towns of San Sebastian de Los Ballesteros, La Victoria and La Carlota through roads. The inauguration took place on April 7, 2010. This route is designed to bring together health, sports and environment. Each municipality has placed an information sign with a map of the route and the trail signposts along the 17 km route, about 5 hours.

 TOURIST ROUTE

We began our visit at the fairgrounds where the Thunder Stone, stone has its legend, to continue along the Paseo de la Victoria. We will meet here at the Plaza of the Constitution, which is the Public School Jose Antonio de Valenzuela and Pensioner's Home. We will follow Jesus Maria Street and continue along the road leading to San Sebastian de los Ballesteros, up to the Cemetery of the Immaculate Conception, built in 1925. After the cemetery we will take the path that will lead to Chapel House Minimum Monks, known as "The Old Victoria", which is the origin of the town, which dates from S. XVI.From here we walk down the street eggs to reach the main street which leads us to the Plaza of Spain.In the Plaza of Spain we find the City Hall, Building 1926, and the Church of San Pedro de Alcantara, built on land ownership Minimum Monks in 1818.After seeing the church continue down the street until you reach Cordoba Velazquez Street, where one can admire the Cortijo de la Condesa de Gavia.De la calle Velázquez arrived at the Plaza de la Constitution, to move along the A-3052 to the Tower of Don Lucas. In this tower Arab Alhaquen times I, and home to the Virgen de la Torre, we enjoy excellent views, ending the visit.

Municipalities in the Province of Córdoba (Spain)